Timothée Houssin (born 29 July 1988) is a French politician from National Rally (RN) who has represented Eure's 5th constituency in the National Assembly since 2022.

References 

1988 births
Living people
National Rally (France) politicians
Deputies of the 16th National Assembly of the French Fifth Republic
21st-century French politicians